Liu Xiaoying is a former Chinese female short track speed skater. She is a silver medallist of the 2004 World Championships in women's relay as well as two-time World Champion in team competitions. She also achieved a number of World Cup podium places.

References

External links
 Profile at www.shorttrackonline.info

Date of birth missing (living people)
Living people
Chinese female short track speed skaters
21st-century Chinese women
Year of birth missing (living people)